Diamond Necklace may refer to:

 The Diamond Necklace (film), a 1921 British silent film directed by Denison Clift
 Affair of the Diamond Necklace, a mysterious incident in the 1780s at the court of Louis XVI of France involving his wife, Queen Marie Antoinette
 The Affair of the Necklace, a 2001 film based on above incident
 Diamond Necklace (film), a 2012 Indian film directed by Lal Jose
 "The Necklace" or "The Diamond Necklace" , an 1884 short story by Guy de Maupassant